Stoppage can refer to:
an unplanned time-out in sport
a technical knockout or corner retirement in combat sports
a worker's strike action
a ceasefire in warfare
Samvara in Jain philosophy
a firearm malfunction 

As a proper noun, Stoppage may refer to